Georgiyevka is a rural locality (a village) in Yefremkinsky Selsoviet, Karmaskalinsky District, Bashkortostan, Russia. The population was 27 as of 2010. There is 1 street.

Geography 
Georgiyevka is located 23 km south of Karmaskaly (the district's administrative centre) by road. Nikiforovka is the nearest rural locality.

References 

Rural localities in Karmaskalinsky District